Heshan  , formerly romanized as Hokshan, is a county-level city of Jiangmen City in the southern part of Guangdong Province, China with a total land area of  and a population of 530,684 inhabitants as of 2020 census and some 200,000 internal migrants. The city is now being conurbated with Jiangmen and so included in the Guangzhou-Shenzhen Pearl River conurbation with more than 65,57 million inhabitants. There are approximately 360,000 people of Heshan origin or descent living in other parts of the world, particularly in the Americas such as Chile, Peru and the United States.

Along the opposite bank of the same river, lie the two municipalities of Nanhai and Shunde. Heshan is around one hour from Hong Kong and Macau by road. Ships ply from here to Hong Kong directly.

Name
Heshan—one of several places in China whose name means "Mount Crane"—takes its name from a nearby mountain thought to resemble the shape of the bird. The spelling Heshan derives from the pinyin romanization of the name's Mandarin pronunciation. The Postal Map spelling Hokshan was a combination of the local Cantonese pronunciation of the first character and the Mandarin pronunciation of the second. Heshan has also been romanized as Ho Shan and Ho-shan.

History 
Heshan was made a prefecture in 1732 during the reign of the Yongzheng Emperor of the Qing. By the 19th century,  made up part of the commandery of Zhaoqing. In 1993, it was promoted to a county-level city.

Administrative divisions 
Heshan Municipality administers ten towns:

Industry 
Heshan is located at the center of one of China's largest furniture producing areas, with approximately 10% of the world's furniture produced on its outskirts.

Culture 
Heshan is the birthplace of the Southern lion dance style known as the Hok San lion dance.

Notable individuals 
Heshan is the birthplace of NBA player Yi Jianlian.

Singaporean community leader and businessman, Yam Kok Yuen, was born in Ha Lok Village in Heshan. He was a founding member of the Malayan Chinese Association in Singapore and was Chairman of the Nanyang Hok San Association and Siew Heng Association in the 1950s. His grandson, Alex Yam, is a current Member of Parliament and Mayor of North West District in Singapore.

Climate

References

Citations

Bibliography
 , reprinted 2000.

County-level cities in Guangdong
Jiangmen